Bradley Imes "Brad" Smith (born March 13, 1977), better known as Brad Imes, is a retired American mixed martial artist. He appeared on The Ultimate Fighter 2, and has competed as a Heavyweight in the UFC, WEC, IFL, PFC, Titan FC, and King of the Cage.

Background
Imes was born and raised in Maryville, Missouri. He began wrestling when he was five years old. He also played high school football in Columbia, Missouri, but did not start at a position on the team. Imes was 5'9" and weighed 165 lbs when he graduated before attending the University of Missouri. Within the next two years, Imes stood at 6'7", weighed 290 lbs, and walked on to the school's football team as a sophomore before earning a scholarship as an offensive tackle and lettering in his senior season. After college, Imes played for the Iowa Barnstormers of the Arena Football League for two seasons and was a strength coach for TCU. Imes later moved to Sacramento, California, where he worked as the general manager of a landscaping supply store before being laid off, and then began pursuing mixed martial arts.

Mixed martial arts career

Early career
Imes made his professional debut in 2004 for the WEC and won his first three fights before being invited to compete on The Ultimate Fighter 2.

The Ultimate Fighter 2
Imes was the last pick for his division, and was coached by his training partner and then-UFC Middleweight Champion, Rich Franklin. In his first fight in the house, Imes defeated Rob MacDonald via triangle choke submission in the first round. In the semi-finals, Imes faced Seth Petruzelli and won via split decision. At The Ultimate Fighter 2 Finale on November 5, 2005, Imes faced future UFC Light Heavyweight Champion Rashad Evans, and lost via split decision, the first loss of his career.

Ultimate Fighting Championship
At UFC Ultimate Fight Night 4 on April 6, 2006, Imes faced Dan Christison and lost via armbar submission in the third round, but won "Fight of the Night" honors. He then won two fights for independent promotions before returning to the UFC at UFC 69 on April 7, 2007, and lost via unanimous decision.

Post-UFC
After his last appearance in the UFC, Imes went 7–1, fighting in promotions such as the Palace Fighting Championship and King of the Cage before being signed by the International Fight League.

International Fight League
Imes made his IFL debut on May 16, 2008 at IFL: Connecticut, facing then-champion Roy Nelson for the IFL Heavyweight Championship. He was knocked out with a punch in the first round.

Post-IFL
Imes went 1–2 in his last three professional fights before retiring. According to Imes, he retired from the sport due to concerns over his brain health after accumulating trauma from football and mixed martial arts.

Post-retirement
Imes works as a project manager for a construction company in San Antonio, TX.
Imes worked as a full-time firefighter in Jefferson City, Missouri.

Imes was featured in a small role in the 2007 action film Missionary Man.

Personal life
Imes and his wife had their first child together in March 2011.

Championships and accomplishments
Ultimate Fighting Championship
Fight of the Night (one time) vs. Dan Christison

Mixed martial arts record 

|-
| Loss
| align=center| 13–7
| Josh Queen
| KO (punches)
| Arena Rumble
| 
| align=center| 1
| align=center| 0:36
| Spokane, Washington, United States
| 
|-
| Loss
| align=center| 13–6
| Patrick Smith
| KO (punches)
| Titan FC 13
| 
| align=center| 1
| align=center| 0:28
| Kansas City, Missouri, United States
| 
|-
| Win
| align=center| 13–5
| Chris Guillen
| Submission (punches)
| EC 109: Extreme Challenge 109
| 
| align=center| 2
| align=center| 3:14
| Moline, Illinois, United States
| 
|-
| Loss
| align=center| 12–5
| Roy Nelson
| KO (punches)
| IFL: Connecticut
| 
| align=center| 1
| align=center| 2:55
| Uncasville, Connecticut, United States
| 
|-
| Win
| align=center| 12–4
| James Jack
| Decision (unanimous)
| TFF: True Fight Fans
| 
| align=center| 3
| align=center| 5:00
| Missouri, United States
| 
|-
| Loss
| align=center| 11–4
| Anthony Ruiz
| Decision (split)
| PFC 6: No Retreat, No Surrender
| 
| align=center| 3
| align=center| 5:00
| Lemoore, California, United States
| 
|-
| Win
| align=center| 11–3
| Chris Blaire
| TKO (punches)
| PFC 5: Beatdown at 4 Bears
| 
| align=center| 1
| align=center| 4:13
| New Town, North Dakota, United States
| 
|-
| Win
| align=center| 10–3
| Bo Cantrell
| Submission (gogoplata)
| KOTC: Arch Rivals
| 
| align=center| 1
| align=center| 0:55
| Reno, Nevada, United States
| 
|-
| Win
| align=center| 9–3
| Zak Jensen
| Submission (gogoplata)
| WFC: Downtown Throwdown
| 
| align=center| 1
| align=center| 1:31
| Minneapolis, Minnesota, United States
| 
|-
| Win
| align=center| 8–3
| Tony Mendoza
| Submission (rear-naked choke)
| Ring Wars 15
| 
| align=center| 1
| align=center| 2:50
| South Dakota, United States
| 
|-
| Win
| align=center| 7–3
| Vince Lucero
| Submission (rear-naked choke)
| Tuff N-Uff 3
| 
| align=center| 1
| align=center| 2:26
| Las Vegas, Nevada, United States
| 
|-
| Loss
| align=center| 6–3
| Heath Herring
| Decision (unanimous)
| UFC 69
| 
| align=center| 3
| align=center| 5:00
| Houston, Texas, United States
| 
|-
| Win
| align=center| 6–2
| Chris Adams
| KO (punch)
| Combat FC 3
| 
| align=center| 1
| align=center| 0:18
| Orlando, Florida, United States
| 
|-
| Win
| align=center| 5–2
| Greg Hammer
| Submission (triangle choke)
| Winter War
| 
| align=center| 2
| align=center| 1:44
| Spirit Lake, Iowa, United States
| 
|-
| Win
| align=center| 4–2
| Cody Monroe
| Submission (punches)
| Ring Style - Bad Blood
| 
| align=center| 1
| align=center| N/A
| Moline, Illinois, United States
| 
|-
| Loss
| align=center| 3–2
| Dan Christison
| Submission (armbar)
| UFC Fight Night 4
| 
| align=center| 3
| align=center| 3:37
| Las Vegas, Nevada, United States
| 
|-
| Loss
| align=center| 3–1
| Rashad Evans
| Decision (split)
| The Ultimate Fighter: Team Hughes vs. Team Franklin Finale
| 
| align=center| 3
| align=center| 5:00
| Las Vegas, Nevada, United States
| 
|-
| Win
| align=center| 3–0
| Mike Dexter
| Submission (triangle choke)
|  WEC 14: Vengeance
| 
| align=center| 1
| align=center| 3:44
| Lemoore, California, United States
| 
|-
| Win
| align=center| 2–0
| Lace Pele
| Submission (punches)
|  WEC 13: Heavyweight Explosion
| 
| align=center| 1
| align=center| 2:04
| Lemoore, California, United States
| 
|-
| Win
| align=center| 1–0
| Jeremy Freitag
| Decision (split)
| WEC 12
| 
| align=center| 3
| align=center| 5:00
| Lemoore, California, United States
|

References

External links

 
 

 Brad Imes' MySpace

1977 births
Living people
American male mixed martial artists
Mixed martial artists from Missouri
Heavyweight mixed martial artists
Mixed martial artists utilizing wrestling
People from Maryville, Missouri
People from Bettendorf, Iowa
Ultimate Fighting Championship male fighters